The 1972 Central Michigan Chippewas football team represented Central Michigan University as an independent during the 1972 NCAA College Division football season. In their sixth season under head coach Roy Kramer, the Chippewas compiled a 5–5–1 record and outscored their opponents, 265 to 190.

On November 4, 1972, the team played its first game at its new stadium, R. Perry Shorts Stadium. The dedication game drew a crowd of 17,000. The new facility was built at a cost of $2 million and had a seating capacity of 19,875. The Chippewas defeated Illinois State, 28-21, in the dedication game.

The team's statistical leaders included quarterback Gary Bevington with 834 passing yards, tailback Chuck Markey with 1,513 rushing yards, and Matt Means with 603 receiving yards. Markey received the team's most valuable player award. Means set a school record with 10 receptions in a 34-0 victory over Indiana State on September 30, 1972.

Schedule

References

Central Michigan
Central Michigan Chippewas football seasons
Central Michigan Chippewas football